The New Zealand women's national cricket team toured Australia in December 1956 and January 1957. They played against Australia in one Test match, which Australia won by an innings and 88 runs. They also competed in the 1956–57 Australian Women's Cricket Championships, a domestic two-day competition, winning one match and drawing the other three.

Squads

Tour Matches

1-day single innings match: Deniliquin v New Zealand

1-day single innings match: Victoria v New Zealand

Only WTest

References

External links
New Zealand Women tour of Australia 1956/57 from Cricinfo

Women's international cricket tours of Australia
1957 in Australian cricket
New Zealand women's national cricket team tours